Wajja River is a river of western Ethiopia. It is a tributary of the Hanger River, and part of the watershed of the Blue Nile.

See also 
 List of rivers of Ethiopia

Nile basin
Rivers of Ethiopia